Cy Warman (June 22, 1855 – April 7, 1914) was an American journalist and author known during his life by the appellation "The Poet Laureate of the Rockies".

Life
Cy (Cyrus) Warman was born on a homestead to John and Nancy Askew Warman of Greenup, Illinois.  He was educated at the common schools there and later became a farmer. Warman married Ida Blanch Hays of St. Jacob, Illinois in 1879.

In 1880, after failing as a wheat broker in Pocahontas, Illinois, Mr. Warman migrated to Denver, Colorado where the Colorado Silver Mining Boom was in progress. There, Warman worked for the Denver and Rio Grande Western Railroad progressing from a "wiper" (charged with keeping the engine area clean) to locomotive fireman and later to railroad engineer. These experiences became the basis for many of his early writings.

In 1888, Mr. Warman became editor of the publication Western Railway. He sold his interest in Western Railway in March 1892 and relocated to Creede, Colorado at the height of the Creede mining boom.  There, he founded the Creede Daily Chronicle.

Warman achieved national recognition in 1892 when, after riding from New York City to Chicago in the cab of the locomotive The Exposition Flyer, he wrote his first railroad story, "A Thousand Miles in a Night" for McClure's Magazine. This was the first of a series of widely popular "True Tales of the Railroad" articles written for McClure's.

Warman's first wife, Ida, died in 1887. Warman remarried in 1892 to Miss Marie Myrtle Jones. Miss Jones inspired the lines for "Sweet Marie", a song which became a popular success in 1893 and was later featured in the 1947 film Life With Father starring Irene Dunne and William Powell.

Warman's writing also attracted the attention of the editors of the New York Sun.  The Sun sponsored him in a journey of over 500 miles on horseback throughout the San Juan mining district of Colorado. The writings inspired by this journey were then published as regular and occasional pieces by The Sun.

For two years after his early successes, Warman traveled in Europe and the Far East as well as Alaska. Upon his return, he lived in Washington for several years and finally built a home in London, Ontario where he lived until his death in 1914.

Death
In the winter of 1913-1914, Warman was stricken with paralysis while in a hotel in Chicago. He died several months later at the St. Luke's Hospital in Chicago after having been acutely ill for several weeks.

Partial List of Works

Books And Pamphlets
1892: 
1894:
1895: 
1897: 
1898: 
1899: 
1899: 
1904:  With Patrick Donan.
1906: 
1906: 
1908: 
1911:

Journals and Periodicals
1892:  Poetry.
1893: 
1894: 
1894: 
1894: 
1894: 
1894:  Poetry.
1895: 
1895: 
1895: 
1896: 
1896: 
1896: 
1897: 
1897: 
1897:  Poetry.
1898: 
1898: 
1898: 
1899: 
1900: 
1900:  Poetry.
1900: 
1902: 
1903:  Poetry.
1906: 
1906: 
1906: 
1911:

See also
 Warman, Saskatchewan
 Warman railway station
 Robert W. Service

References

External links

 
 

1855 births
1914 deaths
American male journalists
American travel writers
American male poets
Poets from Colorado
Denver and Rio Grande Western Railroad
People from Greenup, Illinois
Journalists from Illinois